John McKenzie (19 May 1885 – 21 May 1971) was an  Australian rules footballer who played with Geelong in the Victorian Football League (VFL).

Notes

External links 

1885 births
1971 deaths
Australian rules footballers from Victoria (Australia)
Geelong Football Club players